Syngrapha selecta, the chosen looper moth,  is a moth of the family Noctuidae. The species was first described by Francis Walker in 1858. It is found in North America from the Northwest Territories to Newfoundland south to northern Michigan.

The wingspan is about 38 mm. There is one generation per year.

Reared larvae accepted birch, blueberry and willow.

References

Plusiinae
Moths of North America
Moths described in 1858